Hedwig of Munsterberg-Oels (10/12 June 1508, Oleśnica – 28 November 1531, Legnica) was born Duchess of Münsterberg and Oleśnica and Countess of Kladsko and by marriage Margravine of Brandenburg-Ansbach-Kulmbach.

Hedwig was a daughter of Duke Charles I of Münsterberg-Oels, who was a grandson of the King George of Bohemia. Her mother was Anna of Sagan, a daughter of John II, the last Duke of Żagań (Sagan).

On 9 January 1525 Hedwig married George, Margrave of Brandenburg-Ansbach-Kulmbach. She was George's second wife. The marriage produced two daughters:

 Anna Maria (1526–1589) married in 1544 Duke Christoph of Württemberg (1515–1568)
 Sabina (1529–1575) married in 1548 Elector Johann Georg of Brandenburg (1525–1598)

Hedwig died in Legnica (Liegnitz), where she was buried.

Ancestry

References 
 Norbert Sack, Harald Stark et al.: Three Weddings ... and a schism - Margrave George the Pious and his time.  Written for the special exhibition at the Plassenburg (17 May - 4 October 2009).

External links 
 

1508 births
1531 deaths
Margravines of Germany
Podiebrad family
People from Oleśnica
Silesian nobility